The 2002 Malaysian motorcycle Grand Prix was the fourteenth round of the 2002 MotoGP Championship. It took place on the weekend of 11–13 October 2002 at the Sepang International Circuit.

MotoGP classification

250 cc classification

125 cc classification

Championship standings after the race (MotoGP)

Below are the standings for the top five riders and constructors after round fourteen has concluded.

Riders' Championship standings

Constructors' Championship standings

 Note: Only the top five positions are included for both sets of standings.

References

Malaysian motorcycle Grand Prix
Malaysia
Motorcycle Grand Prix